Valiant Comics is an American comic book publisher. The company was founded in 1989 by former Marvel Comics editor-in-chief Jim Shooter along with lawyer and businessman Steven Massarsky. In 1994, the company was sold to Acclaim Entertainment. The company was restarted as part of Valiant Entertainment by entrepreneurs Dinesh Shamdasani and Jason Kothari in 2005 after Acclaim declared bankruptcy in 2004. 

Valiant Entertainment launched its publishing division in 2012 as part of an initiative dubbed the "Summer of Valiant", winning Publisher of the Year and being nominated for Book of the Year at the Diamond Gem Awards. Valiant has set sales records, and was the most nominated publisher in comics at the 2014, 2015 and 2016 Harvey Awards, releasing the biggest-selling independent crossover event of the decade with "Book of Death" in 2015. Valiant was acquired by DMG Entertainment in 2018.

In 2015, Valiant announced that they had partnered with Sony Pictures to produce five films based on the Bloodshot and Harbinger comic books. The rights for Harbinger would later be acquired from Sony by Paramount Pictures in 2019.

Publication history

Voyager Communications

In 1988, former editor-in-chief of Marvel Comics Jim Shooter, Steven J. Massarsky and a group of investors attempted to purchase Marvel Entertainment. They submitted the second-highest bid, with financier Ronald Perelman submitting the highest bid and acquiring Marvel. Shooter and Massarsky instead formed Voyager Communications in 1989 with significant venture capital financing from Triumph Capital. Valiant (an imprint of Voyager Communications) recruited numerous writers and artists from Marvel, including Barry Windsor-Smith and Bob Layton, and launched an interconnected line of superhero comics featuring a mixture of characters licensed from Western Publishing and original creations.

In 1991, Valiant released its first title, Magnus, Robot Fighter, cover-dated May 1991. Solar, Man of the Atom, cover-dated September 1991 followed as the next release. Rai became the third title published by Valiant and was distributed as a special insert in Magnus, Robot Fighter beginning with issue 5. Harbinger No. 1 was listed on the top ten list of Wizard Magazine for a record eight consecutive months and was eventually named "Collectible of the Decade" while Rai No. 0 appeared on Wizard'''s top ten list for a new record nine consecutive months. In 1992, Valiant won the Best Publisher under 5% Market Share from comic distributor Diamond. The next year, Valiant won Best Publisher over 5% Market Share, becoming the first publisher outside of Marvel and DC to do so. In 1992, Valiant's Editor-In-Chief Jim Shooter was given the Lifetime Achievement Award for co-creating the Valiant Universe in a ceremony that also honored Stan Lee for co-creating the Marvel Universe. However, Shooter left Valiant by the end of 1992. According to Massarsky, "Jim had a different idea as to the direction of the company, and he was asked to leave."

Valiant also engaged in several comic book-marketing innovations common in the 1990s, such as issue zero "origin" issues, the gold logo program, coupons redeemable for original comic books, and chromium covers. Following the conclusion of the "Unity" crossover in September 1992, Valiant released Bloodshot, Ninjak, H.A.R.D. Corps, The Second Life of Dr. Mirage, and Timewalker, among other titles.

Acclaim Comics
In 1994, Voyager Communications was purchased by video game developer and publisher Acclaim Entertainment for $65 million. Acclaim created a number of video games based on Valiant properties, such as Shadow Man, Turok: Dinosaur Hunter, Armorines: Project S.W.A.R.M., and Iron Man and X-O Manowar in Heavy Metal, which featured Valiant's X-O Manowar alongside Marvel's Iron Man. In 2004, after losing a major sports video game license, Acclaim became financially insolvent and filed for Chapter 7 bankruptcy.

In 2005, the rights to Valiant/Acclaim's original characters such as Archer and Armstrong, Rai, and Quantum and Woody were auctioned off and bought by Valiant Entertainment, while the rights to the three licensed characters (Solar, Magnus and Turok) reverted to Classic Media (then-owner of the Gold Key Comics properties), which was acquired by DreamWorks Animation SKG in July 2012. DreamWorks itself was bought by Universal Studios on August 22, 2016.

Valiant Entertainment

In 2005, a group of entrepreneurs led by Dinesh Shamdasani and Jason Kothari raised financing and acquired the rights to the Valiant Comics library from Acclaim Entertainment's estate, forming Valiant Entertainment. In 2007, Valiant hired former Valiant Editor-In-Chief Jim Shooter to write new short stories that would accompany hardcover reprints of classic Valiant Universe stories. Two of the three collections were named among "The Ten Best Collected Editions" of their respective years of publications. In August 2011, after hiring several executives from Marvel Comics and Wizard Entertainment, including Valiant publisher Fred Pierce and Valiant editor-in-chief Warren Simons, former Marvel Comics CEO and vice chairman Peter Cuneo was brought on board as Valiant's chairman and an investor in Valiant Entertainment, with Gavin Cuneo serving as CFO and COO. In May 2012, Valiant Entertainment began publishing new monthly comic books based on the Valiant Comics universe of characters.

In an event dubbed The Summer of Valiant in March 2012, Valiant Entertainment launched the Valiant Comics universe with four ongoing titles, X-O Manowar, Harbinger, Bloodshot and Archer & Armstrong, one launching each month for four months. X-O Manowar premiered May 2, 2012, with the creative team of writer Robert Venditti and artist Cary Nord. The first issue of X-O Manowar received over 42,000 preorders, making Valiant the largest new publisher launch in over a decade, and eventually sold through 4 full-priced printings and 3 additional reduced-priced printings. The release of X-O Manowar was followed by Harbinger, launched in June 2012 by writer Joshua Dysart and artist Khari Evans; Bloodshot, launched in July 2012 by writer Duane Swierczynski and artist Manuel Garcia; and Archer & Armstrong, launched in August 2012 by writer Fred Van Lente and artist Clayton Henry.

To coincide with the launch of publishing in 2012, Valiant introduced the Pullbox Program, which encourages readers to start a pull box subscription for the title being launched with their comics store to obtain an exclusive alternate cover version of the comic, and the QR Voice Variant, where the reader's smartphone, after scanning a QR code on the cover of the comic, plays a video of the figure's mouth, giving the impression that the figure has come to life and is talking to the reader.

Valiant Entertainment extended The Summer of Valiant 2012 event and added a fifth ongoing title with Shadowman in November 2012 by writer Justin Jordan and artist Patrick Zircher. The comic debuted as the number 1, non-Marvel and/or DC comic of the month. At the end of 2012, Valiant won a number of Publisher of the Year awards, winning Publisher of the Year under 5% Market Share and was nominated for Book of the Year for X-O Manowar No. 1 at the Diamond Gem Awards.

In January 2013, Valiant announced that Chief Creative Officer and co-founder Dinesh Shamdasani had been promoted to CEO & Chief Creative Officer.

In May 2013, Shamdasani announced The Summer of Valiant 2013, during which the company would launch two new ongoing titles, Quantum & Woody and Eternal Warrior, and publish a special Bloodshot zero issue. Quantum & Woody, written by James Asmus and drawn by Tom Fowler, launched in July 2013, and became the most-nominated title at the 2014 Harvey Awards.

Several of Valiant's launch titles reached their planned conclusions in 2014, with Harbinger, Bloodshot, and Archer & Armstrong all concluding. Valiant celebrated the milestones by publishing a 48-page anniversary issue for each series' twenty-fifth issue, and hinting at new directions for the characters. Ongoing series such as X-O Manowar, Unity, and Rai continued, and were coupled with limited series such as Harbinger: Omegas, Eternal Warrior: Days of Steel, The Death-Defying Dr. Mirage and The Delinquents. In December 2013, Valiant announced the 2014 "Armor Hunters" crossover storyline, consisting of a four-issue Armor Hunter mini-series and issues of XO-Manowar and Unity. In 2014, Valiant announced several new partnerships with digital distributors, including Visionbooks, to distribute a form of animated Valiant comic books for digital devices.

Following the conclusion of Armor Hunters, Valiant announced its "Valiant Next" initiative. Launching in December 2014 with the miniseries The Valiant, it continued through 2015 with the ongoing titles Ninjak, Imperium, Ivar, Timewalker and Bloodshot Reborn and the miniseries Divinity. For the Summer of 2015, Valiant announced the event miniseries Book of Death, accompanied by one-shots Book of Death: The Fall of Bloodshot, Book of Death: The Fall of Ninjak, Book of Death: The Fall of Harbinger and Book of Death: The Fall of X-O Manowar and the miniseries Book of Death: Legends of the Geomancer. Book of Death was one of the best-reviewed comics of the year and the biggest selling independent crossover event of the decade. Spinning out from Book of Death, the ongoing series Wrath of the Eternal Warrior launched in November 2015.

Valiant's CEO Dinesh Shamdasani announced at Valiant Summit 2016 that Valiant would spend 2016 focusing on expanding its universe of characters beyond its core titles, launching brand new characters in the Britannia and Savage miniseries; expanding Divinity in two sequels — Divinity II and Divinity III: Stalinverse; and elevating supporting characters from the Harbinger title in two new miniseries — Generation Zero and Faith.

The four-issue Faith miniseries launched in January 2016, garnering significant media interest, and was one of only a handful of series in the past decade to reach a fifth printing.

In 2016, Valiant was nominated for 50 Harvey Awards, the most nominations for any publisher that year, including 8 for Bloodshot Reborn.

DMG Entertainment
On January 29, 2018, it was announced that DMG Entertainment had acquired full ownership of Valiant Entertainment after already owning 57% of the company. As part of the acquisition, it was announced that Valiant's CEO Dinesh Shamdasani would be leaving the company along with chairman Peter Cuneo and CFO Gavin Cuneo, with Dinesh and Gavin serving as consultants, while Valiant's publishing team, overseen by publisher Fred Pierce and editor-in-chief Warren Simons, would remain. On February 23, 2018, Valiant announced The Life and Death of Toyo Harada, a six-issue miniseries written by Joshua Dysart and drawn by CAFU that would be released sometime in 2019. On March 6, 2018, it was announced that Valiant's Vice President of Marketing & Communications Hunter Gorinson had left the company.

On March 8, 2018, it was announced that actor Vin Diesel had signed on to portray Bloodshot in the film of the same name. On March 8, 2018, Valiant announced it had hired Karl Bollers as an editor. On March 22, 2018, Valiant announced it had hired Mel Caylo as Director of Marketing. On April 9, 2018, Valiant announced it had hired Joe Illidge as Executive Editor as of April 5, 2018. On April 16, 2018, Valiant's editor-in-chief Warren Simons announced that he had left the company. On April 17, Valiant announced it had promoted Robert Meyers from Managing Editor to Editorial Director.

On June 7, 2018, Valiant announced they would launch four new titles under the "Valiant Beyond" banner, with Faith: Dreamside, a limited series written by Jody Houser and drawn by MJ Kim, launching in September; Bloodshot Rising Spirit, an ongoing series written by Lonnie Nadler & Zac Thompson and drawn by Ken Lashley, launching in November; Livewire, a limited series written by Vita Ayala and drawn by Raúl Allén & Patricia Martín, launching in December; and Incursion, a limited series written by Andy Diggle and drawn by Doug Braithwaite, launching in February 2019.

On July 5, 2018, Valiant announced that comics retailer Matthew Klein had joined the company as its Sales Director after previously working at the company as a Sales Manager. On July 26, 2018, Valiant announced that comic industry veteran Lysa Hawkins had joined the company as an editor. On September 13, 2018, Valiant announced it had hired Emily Hecht as Sales & Social Media Manager. On October 3, 2018, Valiant announced it had promoted Karl Bollers to Senior Editor.

On October 24, 2018, Valiant announced it had hired former intern Oliver Taylor as International Licensing Coordinator. On October 31, 2018, Valiant announced it had promoted Julia Walchuk to Sales and Live Events Manager. On December 9, 2018, Valiant announced it had promoted Matthew Klein to Vice President of Sales and Marketing. On December 11, 2018, it was announced that Joe Illidge had left the company and that Robert Meyers had been promoted to Senior Editorial Director.

On December 12, 2018, Valiant announced its "Breakthrough" lineup of first issues launching in 2019. The four titles include the previously announced The Life and Death of Toyo Harada, written by Joshua Dysart and drawn by various artists launching in March; Punk Mambo, a five-issue limited series written by Cullen Bunn and drawn by Adam Gorham launching in April; Fallen World, a five-issue event series written by Dan Abnett and drawn by Adam Pollina featuring the character Rai launching in May; and Killers, written by B. Clay Moore and drawn by Fernando Dagnino launching in July. Two days later, the company announced it had hired Editorial intern Drew Baumgartner as Assistant Editor and Zane Warman as Domestic Licensing Coordinator.

On January 7, 2019, Valiant announced it had hired former JHU Comic Books manager Dani Ward as its Sales Manager. On January 9, 2019, Valiant announced it had hired former Marvel assistant editor Heather Antos as an editor. The following month Valiant announced an ongoing Psi Lords series written by Fred Van Lente and drawn by Renato Guedes that will launch in July 2019. This would be followed in subsequent months by announcements of new series. On March 14 Valiant announced a new Bloodshot ongoing series would launch in September 2019, written by Tim Seely and drawn by Brett Booth. The series will launch with a one-shot written by Seely which will be released on May 4, 2019 as part of Free Comic Book Day. The first three issues will be collected and released as a trade paperback in December to coincide with the release of the Bloodshot movie on February 21, 2020. On April 17 editor Heather Antos announced on Twitter that a new X-O Manowar ongoing series would launch in November 2019, written by Dennis Hopeless and drawn by Emilio Laiso. On July 11 a four-issue mini-Ninjak series was scheduled to debut that October, written by Cullen Bunn and drawn by Ramon F. Bachs.

On July 30, Valiant announced it had hired Kat O'Neill as Live Events & Sales Manager. On August 13 Valiant announced a new Rai ongoing series would launch in November, written by Dan Abnett and drawn by Juan José Ryp. On September 17 Valiant announced a five-issue The Visitor mini-series would launch in December, written by Paul Levitz and drawn by M.J. Kim. Three days later, the company hired Legendary Comics Co-Founder/Senior Editor Greg Tumbarello as Editor to develop new properties and advance existing IP.

On October 1, 2019, Valiant announced a new Quantum & Woody series would launch in January 2020, written by Chris Hastings and drawn by Ryan Browne. Two days later, the company revealed that the character Faith Herbert would be featured in a series of Young adult prose novels co-published with HarperCollins imprint Balzer + Bray. The first novel, FAITH: Taking Flight, written by author Julie Murphy, will be released in Spring 2020. On October 30 Valiant released a teaser image featuring the bird logo of Harbinger on a blue background, with the hashtag #Valiant2020 on the bottom.

On November 12, 2019, Valiant announced that a new version of Doctor Tomorrow would be debuting in a self-titled ongoing series that will launch in February 2020, written by Alejandro Arbona and drawn by Jim Towe. On November 18 Valiant announced that President of Consumer Products Russell Brown, who had been with the company since January 2013, had left in order to take up the position of Senior VP of Entertainment at Authentic Brands Group.

On March 11, 2020, Valiant announced that Heather Antos and Lysa Hawkins had been promoted to Senior Editors.

On July 29, 2020, Valiant announced it had hired former Marvel and Top Cow editor David Wohl as a senior editor. On August 17, the company indicated that it would restructure the company, bringing its publishing, TV and film divisions closer together and moving its New York offices to another location within the city, with editor David Wohl working out of the Los Angeles offices of DMG Entertainment.

Awards and recognition

 Valiant was named "Comic Book Publisher of the Year – Under 4%" by Diamond Comics Distributors in the Diamond GEM Awards in 2013.
 Valiant was named "Best Publisher" by Ambush Bug, Matt Adler and The Dean of Ain't It Cool News in Day One of the 9th Annual "AICN Comics @$$IE Awards" in 2013.
 Valiant was named "Best Publisher 2012" by Sheldon Lee of Comic Impact in the "Best of 2012" awards in 2013.
 Valiant was named "Best Publisher" of 2012 by Joel Rickenbach of Mania in "The Best Books of 2012" article in 2013.
 Valiant was named "Most Effective Relaunch (This Decade)" by the staff of ComicsAlliance in the "Best Comics of 2012" column in 2013.
 Valiant was voted number 1 in the "Which Comic Publisher's Output in 2013 Were You Most Thankful For?" poll on Comic Book Resources in 2014.
 Valiant was named "Item to Watch for 2014" by Rob McMonigal of Newsarama in "The Best of Best Shots 2013" column in 2013.
 Valiant was named "Best Publisher" by Optimous Douche and Ambush Bug of Ain't It Cool News in Day One of the 10th Annual "AICN COMICS 10th Annual @$$IE Awards" in 2014.

Characters

Universe

In other media
Audio
In August 2014, Valiant partnered with Pendant Productions to produce audio dramas based on their comic books. The first of these, Archer & Armstrong: The Michelangelo Code, was released in 2016.

Film and television
In March 2015, Valiant signed a partnership agreement with DMG Entertainment which included a nine-figure investment for film and TV adaptations of the Valiant characters.

In March 2018, it was announced that Vin Diesel would star in a film adaption of the Valiant character Bloodshot. The film was released on March 13, 2020 to mixed reviews.

In July 2018, Sony Pictures announced they were developing a movie based on Valiant character Faith Herbert, with Maria Melnik writing the screenplay.

In September 2019, it was announced that Paramount had acquired the rights to the Harbinger movie from Sony, with Neal Moritz, Toby Jaffe and Dan Mintz attached as producers.

Web series
Bat in the Sun Productions and Valiant Digital produced the web series Ninjak vs. the Valiant Universe'', with actor/musician Michael Rowe in the role of Ninjak. The series was released on April 21, 2018 on ComicBook.com.

Video games
In December 2019, Valiant announced a partnership with Blowfish Studios to create multiplatform video games featuring Valiant characters.

References

External links

 Official website
 
 

Valiant Comics
Publishing companies established in 1989